Mount Adkins is a mountain surmounting the north flank of Mosby Glacier just west of the mouth of Fenton Glacier in Palmer Land. Mapped by United States Geological Survey (USGS) from ground surveys and U.S. Navy air photos, 1961–67. Named by Advisory Committee on Antarctic Names (US-ACAN) for Thomas Adkins, cook with the Palmer Station winter party in 1965.

Adkins